This page provides the list of songs sung by Ilaiyaraaja. He has sung over 380 songs of his own tunes as well as done playback singing for other music directors.

Songs list

Film songs

1990s

Non-film songs

References 

Ilaiyaraaja
India music-related lists
Ilaiyaraaja